Ijlil al-Shamaliyya ( Ijlīl aš-Šamāliyya) was a Palestinian Arab village in the Jaffa Subdistrict. It was depopulated during the 1947–1948 Civil War in Mandatory Palestine on April 3, 1948.

Location

History
During the late  Ottoman period, in June 1870, the French explorer Victor Guérin visited both villages. He described them as one unit called Edjlil, situated on a hill and divided into two districts. Together, they had 380 inhabitants. The houses were built of rammed earth or with different small aggregates  mixed in with kneaded and dried silt. In 1882,  the PEF's Survey of Western Palestine described the two villages, named El Jelil,  as "a mud village, with a  well to the south and a second to the north. [..] A small olive-grove exists to the south-east."

British Mandate era
In the 1922 census of Palestine conducted by the British Mandate authorities, the twin villages of Ijlil (spelled Jelil) had a population of 154, all Muslims,  increasing by the 1931 census to 305, still all Muslim.  In 1943 Glil Yam was founded on what was traditionally village land, to the east of the village site.

In the 1945 statistics the population of Ijlil al-Shamaliyya consisted of 190 Muslims and the land area was 2,450  dunams of land, according to an official land and population survey. Of this land, 183 dunams were designated for citrus and bananas, 13 for plantations and irrigable land, 1,574 for cereals, while seven dunams were built-up areas. Also in 1945, a school was founded in the village and shared with Ijlil al-Qibliyya. It had 64 students in its first year. The village also had a mosque and several small shops.

1948 war, and aftermath
In December 1947 and January 1948 the leaders of al-Shaykh Muwannis, al-Mas'udiyya, al-Jammasin al-Sharqi, al-Jammasin al-Gharbi, and the mukhtars of 'Arab Abu Kishk and the two Ijlil-villages met with Haganah representatives in Petah Tikva. These villages wanted peace, and promised not to harbor any Arab Liberation Army soldiers or local Arab militia. They further promised that, in the case they were not able to keep them out alone, they were to call on Haganah for help.

By mid-March 1948, the Alexandroni Brigade had imposed isolation, dubbed "quarantine", of al-Shaykh Muwannis, 'Arab Abu Kishk and the two Ijlil-villages. However, on 12 March, the LHI kidnapped five village notables from al-Shaykh Muwannis. This undermined the villagers' trust in former agreements, and many left. The people of the two Ijlil-villages also left, after asking Jewish neighbours to look after their property.

In 1992, the historian Walid Khalidi found that the place was difficult to identify with precision as it was part of a large garbage dump.

References

Bibliography

 (pp. 192−196: "Les Trois−Ponts, Jorgilia")

External links
Welcome To Ijlil al-Shamaliyya
Survey of Western Palestine, Map 13: IAA,  Wikimedia commons
Ijlil al Shamaliyya from the Khalil Sakakini Cultural Center
Ijlil al-Shamaliyya, Zochrot
 Ijlil  tour, 20.3.04, from Zochrot
Ibrahim Abu-Sneineh, Ijlil, Testimony collected in preparation for Zochrot's tour and booklet of Ijlil, March 30, 2004
Mahmoud Abu-Sneineh, Ijlil, Testimony collected in preparation for Zochrot's tour and booklet of Ijlil, March 20, 2004.
Remembering Ijlil, Ijlil Booklet, 03/2004

Arab villages depopulated during the 1948 Arab–Israeli War
District of Jaffa